was a Kugyō (high-ranking Japanese official) from the late Heian period to the early Kamakura period. His father was Motozane, the founder of Konoe family, and his mother was a daughter of Tadataka. Among his sons is Iezane. His wife is the sixth no Sadako.

In 1179, Motomichi was promoted to kampaku, regent, as a result of the coup led by Kiyomori, the father of his stepmother who also his father-in-law. In February of the following year he took the position of sesshō, regent-ship for Emperor Antoku.

In 1208, he ordained as a Buddhist monk and took the Dharma name Gyōri (行理).

Parents
Father: Konoe Motozane 
Mother: Fujiwara no Tadataka
Wife: Taira no Sadako, daughter of Taira no Kiyomori  (平完子)
Concubine: Daughter of Minamoto no Akinobu
Konoe Iezane (近衞家実; 1179-1242), first son
Concubine: Taira no Nobuko (平信子 )
Konoe Michitsune (近衞道經; 1184-1238), second son
Concubine: Daughtjer of a monk
Takatsukasa Kanemoto (鷹司兼基), third son
Motonori Fujiwara (藤原基教; 1196-1213), fourth son
Unknown Concubine
Enchu (円忠; 1180-1234）
Enjō (円浄; 1189-1256)
Enki (円基)
Shizuchu (静忠; 1190-1263）
Nisumi (仁澄)
Minobu (実信)
Mitoko (尊任)

Fujiwara clan
Konoe family
1160 births
1223 deaths
People of Heian-period Japan
People of Kamakura-period Japan
Kamakura period Buddhist clergy